Ernest M. Sands (April 30, 1922 – April 9, 2012) was a North Dakota Republican Party politician who served as the 32nd Lieutenant Governor of North Dakota from 1981 to 1985. Sands also served in the North Dakota Senate from 1967 to 1970 and from 1973 to 1980.

Background
Ernest Sands was born in Pincher Creek, Alberta and his parents were United States citizens which made him a United States citizen. In 1930, Sands and his family moved to Minot, North Dakota. He graduated from Minot High School and then went to Minot State Teachers College (now Minot State University). Sands served in the United States Army Air Force during World War II as a Bombardier for the 458th Bomb Group, 755th Squadron (B-24). On October 14, 1944, his plane was shot down over Cologne, Germany and he was able to evade capture for several days. He was eventually captured and spent the rest of the war in Stalag Luft III and Stalag VIIA until he was repatriated by Patton's forces on April 29, 1945. In 1946, Sands received his degree in business administration from the University of North Dakota. Sands and his wife moved to Velva, North Dakota where he owned a funeral home, furniture and hardware businesses. In 1960, he served on the Velva City Council and in 1962 was the mayor of Velva, North Dakota. In 1967, he served in the North Dakota Senate and then Lieutenant Governor of North Dakota 1981–1985. He died in Minot, North Dakota.

Notes

External links
In Memory of Ernest M. Sands

1922 births
2012 deaths
People from the Municipal District of Pincher Creek No. 9
People from McHenry County, North Dakota
People from Minot, North Dakota
Military personnel from North Dakota
Minot State University alumni
University of North Dakota alumni
Businesspeople from North Dakota
North Dakota city council members
Mayors of places in North Dakota
American prisoners of war in World War II
Lieutenant Governors of North Dakota
Republican Party North Dakota state senators
Shot-down aviators
United States Army Air Forces pilots of World War II
World War II prisoners of war held by Germany
20th-century American politicians
20th-century American businesspeople
American expatriates in Canada